Urs Steinemann (born 1 February 1959) is a Swiss rower. He competed in the men's double sculls event at the 1984 Summer Olympics.

References

External links
 

1959 births
Living people
Swiss male rowers
Olympic rowers of Switzerland
Rowers at the 1984 Summer Olympics
Place of birth missing (living people)